The 2005 Belgian Supercup was a football match between the winners of the previous season's Belgian First Division and Belgian Cup competitions. The match was contested by Cup winners Germinal Beerschot, and 2004–05 Belgian First Division champions, Club Brugge on 30 July 2005 at the ground of the league champions as usual, in this case the Jan Breydel Stadium.

Club Brugge won its fourth consecutive Supercup title and 13th in total, as it beat Germinal Beerschot on penalty kicks.

Details

See also
2004–05 Belgian First Division
2004–05 Belgian Cup

References

Belgian Super Cup 2005
Beerschot A.C.
Belgian Super Cup, 2005
Belgian Supercup
July 2005 sports events in Europe
Belgian Super Cup 2005